Waymansville is an unincorporated community in Jackson Township, Bartholomew County, in the U.S. state of Indiana.

History
Waymansville had a post office between 1860 and 1940. The community was named for its founder, Charles L. Wayman. Waymansville has one church, named St. Peter Lutheran Church. It was founded in 1871 and is a member of the Lutheran Church - Missouri Synod.

Geography

Demographics

Waymansville appeared as a separately-returned community in the U.S. Census of 1870, when it had a reported population of 55 residents.

References

Unincorporated communities in Bartholomew County, Indiana
Unincorporated communities in Indiana
1860 establishments in Indiana